Mirdza Martinsone (24 November 1916 – 20 September 1983) was a Latvian alpine skier. She competed in the women's combined event at the 1936 Winter Olympics.

References

1916 births
1983 deaths
Latvian female alpine skiers
Olympic alpine skiers of Latvia
Alpine skiers at the 1936 Winter Olympics
Place of birth missing